The Dockside Cannabis Museum is a museum in Seattle, Washington state, United States. It displays historical packaging from prior to the U.S. prohibition of cannabis, and photography. The museum is inside a cannabis store in the city's SODO neighborhood.

References

External links
 

Cannabis museums
Museums in Seattle